Jan Jakub Twardowski (1 June 1915 – 18 January 2006) was a Polish poet and Catholic priest. He was a chief Polish representative of contemporary religious lyrics. He wrote short, simple poems, humorous, which often included colloquialisms. He joined observations of nature with philosophical reflections.

Biography
Jan Twardowski was born on 1 June 1915 in Warsaw, Congress Poland. His parents were Jan Twardowski and Aniela Maria Konderska. Several weeks after his birth, due to the events of World War I, his family moved to Russia After 3 years, they returned to Warsaw. He finished middle school in 1935.
In 1932 he began working with the youth newspaper "Kuźnia Młodych" ("Forge of the Young"). He had his own column there, for which he wrote poems, short stories, and interviewed various writers.

After middle school, he began studying literature at the Józef Piłsudski University (University of Warsaw). In 1937 he published his first book of poetry.

During World War II he took part in various operations organised by the Armia Krajowa and fought in the Warsaw Uprising.

After the war, he joined a seminary and began studying theology at the Warsaw University. He became a priest in 1948. In 1959 he became a provost of the Visitationist Church. His writings were published in a popular Polish Catholic magazine, Tygodnik Powszechny. He gained fame in 1960 after publishing his first poetry book, "Znak Ufności" ("The Sign of Trust"). In 1980 he received the PEN Club and Robert Graves lifetime achievement awards, and, in 1996, the Order Uśmiechu (The Order of the Smile). In 2000, Twardowski won the IKAR prize, and was rewarded with the TOTUS prize a year later.

Jan Twardowski died on 18 January 2006 in Warsaw. He was buried within the crypts of the Temple of Divine Providence on the outskirts of the Polish capital, despite the fact that he wanted to be buried at the Powązki cemetery in Warsaw.

Works

Poetry:
 1959: Wiersze, ("Verses"); Warsaw
 1970: Znaki ufności, ("Signs of Trust"), Kraków: Znak
 1980: Niebieskie okulary, ("Blue Sunglasses"), Kraków: Znak
 1983: Który stwarzasz jagody ("Who Made the Blueberry"), Kraków: Wydawnictwo literackie
 1986: Nie przyszedłem pana nawracać. Wiersze z lat 1937-1985 "I Have Not Come to Convert You: Poems From the Years 1937-1985"), Warsaw: Wydawnictwo Archidiecezji Warszawskiej ("Warsaw Archdiocese Publisher")
 1990: Tak ludzka ("So Human"), Poznań: Księgarnia św. Wojciech
 1991: Uśmiech Pana Boga. Wiersze dla dzieci ("The Smile of God. Poems for children"), Warsaw: Nasza Księgarnia
 1993: Kasztan dla milionera. Wiersze dla dzieci ("A Chestnut For a Millionaire. Poems for Children"), Warsaw: Nasza Księgarnia
 1993: Krzyżyk na drogę ("A cross for the road"), Kraków: Znak
 1996: Rwane prosto z krzaka ("Torn Right Off the Bush"), Warsaw: PIW
 1998: Bóg prosi o miłość - Gott fleht um Liebe ("God Asks for Love"),  Kraków: Wydawnictwo Literary
 1998: Niebo w dobrym humorze ("Heaven in Good Mood"), Warsaw: PIW
 1999: Miłość miłości szuka, Volumes 1 and 2 ("Love Seeks Love"), Warsaw: PIW, Księgarnia i Drukarnia Świętego Wojciecha
 2000: Elementarz księdza Twardowskiego dla najmłodszego, średniaka i starszego, Kraków: Wydawnictwo literackie
 2001: Kiedy mówisz ("When You Say"), Kraków: Wydawnictwo literackie
 2006: Kilka myśli o cierpieniu, przemijaniu i odejściu, Poznan: Księgarnia Św. Wojciecha ("A few thoughts about suffering, passing and leaving")

Prose:
 1973: Zeszyt w kratkę ("The Graph-Paper Notebook"), Kraków: Znak
 1986: Nowy zeszyt w kratkę ("The New Graph-Paper Notebook"), Poznan: Pallotinum
 1987: Patyki i patyczki ("Sticks and Twigs"), Warsaw: Wydawnictwo Archidiecezji Warszawskiej "Publisher of the Archdiocese of Warsaw" 
 1991: Niecodziennik ("Not Quite a Diary"), Kraków: Maszachaba

References

External links
 Group memory in the network Vkontakte - club18291564 (rus)

1915 births
2006 deaths
Polish male poets
20th-century Polish Roman Catholic priests
Polish resistance members of World War II
Warsaw Uprising insurgents
Catholic poets
20th-century Polish poets
20th-century Polish male writers
21st-century Polish poets
21st-century Polish male writers
Writers from Warsaw